The Newark Museum Explorers Program is a year-round work-based, college-preparatory, and mentoring program that supports Newark high school students in their exploration of the sciences and humanities, and pursuit of a college education. The program is run from the Newark Museum in Newark, New Jersey, United States.

History
In 1995, the Science Explorer's Program was the recipient of a start-up grant under the YouthAlive! Project, a national initiative, funded by the DeWitt Wallace Reader's Digest Fund in partnership with the Association of Science-Technology Centers (ASTC). The initiative called for the development of programs in museums that could provide positive work and learning opportunities for young people.

The Newark Museum, in keeping with its long history of actively addressing the needs of its community, designed such a program. Through the years, the Explorers' program has evolved into a successful college and job preparedness program that provides invaluable education, employment, and mentoring opportunities to urban youth.

The Newark Museum Explorers Program is also a recipient of a grant provided by the Rivendell Foundation.

Meetings and workshops
Explorers meet regularly for workshops, meetings and training sessions prior to each festival. Workshops offered in the past includes public speaking workshops, financial literacy workshops, glass art workshops, etiquette workshops, animation workshops, mural painting, soap and candle making workshops.

Meetings, workshops scheduled by program coordinator and field trips supersedes internship duties. If a meeting, field trip or workshop conflicts with Explorer's internship schedule, it is the Explorer's responsibility to inform their supervisor of the existing conflict in schedule.

Explorers are expected to participate in all meetings, workshops and field trips throughout their participation in the program. Attendance and participation in these events are vital parts of each student's experience and their continuation to participate in the Program.

Internships
To equip students with employable skills, students will have the opportunity to work in different departments at the Newark Museum and other partnering organizations during their internships as well as varying museum activities, events and festivals.

Explorers are assigned mentors who supervise them through the acquisition of employable skills in different departments, events and festivals such as:
weekend family arts and science activities, Science Department, Dynamic Earth, Membership, Exhibits, Special Events, Junior Museum, Planetarium, Visitor Services, Museum Library, School Programs, and Museum Shop. Explorers work for about 4 hours per week during the school year, and about 20 hours per week during the summer.

Students have the opportunity to work in different departments as well as varying museum activities, festivals and events in order to gain employable skills.

The Explorers Program is a job preparedness program. Therefore, students are not compensated for participation in workshops, trainings and field trips.

Field trips
Explorers are engaged in outdoor education through several field trips. In the past, Explorers have taken trips to The Bronx Zoo, New York Aquarium, CSI: The Experience, Bodies Exhibit, Mural Tour of Philadelphia, Metropolitan Museum of Arts, World Series of Birding, Osprey Banding in Maryland, American Museum of Natural History and the Wax Museum. Explorers have also visited colleges such as Yale, Columbia University, Montclair University, Pennsylvania State University, New York University and The College of New Jersey.

At the end of each year, graduating classes attend a 3-day senior trip. In the past, the graduating Explorers have visited Puerto Rico, 1000 Acres Ranch Resort New York, Baltimore, Maryland, and Montreal, Canada.

Alumni
Since its inception in 1994, the Explorers Program has maintained a 90% retention rate. The Explorers Program gives students a stronger leadership background and opens up doors that these students never thought they could walk through. Students leave the program with new found courage, leadership, and skills they might never have attained without the help of this program.

During the course of the year, each student attends an average of 80 meetings, a minimum of 10 additional training sessions and log in about 320 internship hours. The students' participation and retention in the program indicates that they are enjoying the program.

The Explorers program maintained a 95% retention rate in 2012–13. The program has maintained a 100% high school graduation and college attendance for five years from 2008.

225 students have graduated from the Explorers program since its conception in 1995, and have been attending an institution of higher education within 12 months of their high school graduation.

The alumni component is vital to track long-term success of the program. This component will include annual luncheons open to all alumni. This luncheon aims to be aware of the Alumnus progress and create a mentoring opportunity for the program. This component will also host an alumni reunion every 2–3 years. The Explorers Peer Mentor will oversee Explorers Alumni affairs.

Some alumni attend leading institutions of higher learning such as Harvard Law School, Princeton University, Columbia University, and Cornell University, where they studied:
nursing, engineering, medicine, chemistry, mathematics, education, architecture, microbiology, cell biology, Biochemistry, Graphic design, International Relations, Sociology, Biology and nutrition , business, and computer graphics, just to mention a few.

Among professions represented by alumni include:
lawyers, educators, graphic designers, entrepreneurs, motion capture animator, mental health Councilor, registered nurse, licensed optician, crisis councilor, accounts executive, banker, financial specialist, software engineer, pharmacist, hospitality and management, diplomacy consultant

Features
The program's features include:

 Personalized college guidance
 Connections to Museum professionals
 Access to exhibition designers and outstanding art and science collections
 Presentations by working scientists and researchers
 Field trips and related trainings at the region's wildlife reserves 
 Opportunities to apply scientific principles

Over a three-year period, the program nurtures the students' academic development and career aspirations.

Program activities occur during after school hours (3.30–5.00pm), on weekends from 9 to 5 pm, during June and July, and school breaks.

References

External links
 Newark Museum Explorers Program official website
 Newark Museum Explorers on Facebook
 

1995 establishments in New Jersey
Education in Newark, New Jersey
After school programs
Internship programs
United States educational programs
Museum education